Samar College, Inc. (Filipino: Kolehiyo ng Samar;Waray: Eskuwelahan Tersyedad han Samar) (abbreviated as SC) is a private school in Catbalogan, Samar, Philippines. It was founded in 1949 as the Samar Junior College and initially offered Elementary Teacher Certificate and Associate in Arts. Bachelor's degree programs in Education were opened in the 1950s, while the Bachelor of Science in Commerce followed in the 1980s. The college expanded its undergraduate programs throughout the years, and it eventually established the College of Graduate Studies in the late 1990s. This was also the same time that the high school and elementary departments were opened.

At present, Samar College provides programs in the elementary, junior high school, senior high school, undergraduate, and graduate levels. The college department has four academic units which offer courses in Criminology, Business Administration, Elementary and Secondary Education, English Language, and Information Technology. For college graduates who wish to pursue further studies, SC's College of Graduate Studies has an MA in Education program.

Reputation 
 Samar College perfected a cultural dance troupe called the Rayhak Dance Troupe. It is famous and sought after by organizers of big events such as the Manaragat Festival in Catbalogan, the Mutya han Samar Beauty Pageant in Samar, and the Department of Tourism’s “Festival of Festivals” in Manila.
 The school received two awards for excellence from the Department of Education, Culture and Sports (now Department of Education), Regional Office No. VIII for its commitment to quality education.

See also 
Saint Mary’s College of Catbalogan
Samar State University
Northwest Samar State University

References 

Private schools in the Philippines
Universities and colleges in Samar (province)
Education in Catbalogan